The SS7 LRT station is a light rapid transit (LRT) station that serves the suburb of Kelana Jaya in Selangor, Malaysia. It serves as one of the stations on the Shah Alam line, the station is an elevated rapid transit station in Petaling Jaya , Selangor, Malaysia, forming part of the Klang Valley Integrated Transit System. The station will be built in SS7 township in Petaling Jaya opposite Persada PLUS, the headquarters of the PLUS Expressways and Subang Toll Plaza of the New Klang Valley Expressway.

The station is marked as Station No. 6 along with the RM9 billion line project with the line's maintenance depot located in Johan Setia, Klang. The SS7 LRT station is expected to be operational in February 2024 and will have facilities such as kiosks, restrooms, elevators, taxi stand and feeder bus among others.

Locality landmarks
 Kelana Square (the station is right behind this business complex)
 Paradigm Mall PJ
 Le Meridien Petaling Jaya Hotel (ex-New World)
 Kelana D'Putra Condominium
 Zenith Residences and Corporate Park (less than 5 minutes walk)
 Pinnacle Kelana Jaya
 Kelana Mahkota Condominium
 Kelana Putri Condominium
 Laguna Residences
 Sterling Condominium
 Tiara Kelana Condominium
 Taman Mayang, Kelana Jaya

References

External links
 LRT3 Bandar Utama–Klang line

Rapid transit stations in Selangor
Shah Alam Line